

List

References

D